The Blues Hot and Cold is an album by jazz trombonist and arranger Bob Brookmeyer recorded in 1960 for the Verve label.

Reception

The Allmusic review by Ken Dryden stated "Bob Brookmeyer is thought of as a cool jazz stylist, though the valve trombonist throws everyone a curve with these 1960 small group dates. Accompanied by pianist Jimmy Rowles, bassist Buddy Clark, and drummer Mel Lewis, Brookmeyer delves into music from the swing era, utilizing a mute throughout most of the album, something he doesn't use all that often".

Track listing
All compositions by Bob Brookmeyer except as indicated
 "On the Sunny Side of the Street" (Jimmy McHugh, Dorothy Fields) - 6:04 	
 "Stoppin' at the Savoy" - 5:54
 "Languid Blues" - 7:21
 "I Got Rhythm" (George Gershwin, Ira Gershwin) - 4:53
 "Smoke Gets in Your Eyes" (Jerome Kern, Otto Harbach) - 5:48 	
 "Hot and Cold Blues" - 7:57

Personnel 
Bob Brookmeyer - valve trombone
Jimmy Rowles - piano
Buddy Clark - bass
Mel Lewis - drums

References 

1960 albums
Verve Records albums
Bob Brookmeyer albums
Albums produced by Norman Granz